BM25 may refer to:

 BM-25 (multiple rocket launcher), a Soviet multiple rocket launcher
   BM-25 Musudan, a North Korean intermediate-range ballistic missile thought to be designed in 1960's And made in 1970's, it was seen in late 1980's by photographer's
 Okapi BM25, a ranking function in information retrieval